"Prix de Rome" may refer to: 

 Prix de Rome of the French government
 Prix de Rome (Belgium)
 Prix de Rome (Canada)
 Prix de Rome (Netherlands) 
 Rome Prize of the American Academy in Rome 
 Rome Scholarship of the British School at Rome